Park Jin-Po  (born 13 August 1987) is a South Korean footballer who plays as a full back for Ulsan Citizen FC in  K3 League.

Club career
Park was selected from the K-League draft by Seongnam Ilhwa Chunma for the 2011 K-League season. On 5 March 2011, Park made his debut against Pohang Steelers in a 1–1 away draw, and promptly earned himself a yellow card.

Club career statistics

As of 25 November 2011

Honors 
Seongnam Ilhwa Chunma

2011 FA Cup Winner

References

External links 

1987 births
Living people
Association football defenders
South Korean footballers
Seongnam FC players
Gimcheon Sangmu FC players
Jeju United FC players
K League 1 players
K League 2 players
People from Ulsan